Pozos is a  district in Santa Ana canton, San José province of Costa Rica. It was created in 1907. The principal avenue of the district carries the name of Lindora, which is also used to name the district and its surroundings.

Toponymy 
 is translated as ponds, of which there were many due to clay terrains at the north part of the district.

Geography 
Pozos has an area of  km² and an elevation of  metres.

Villages
The district encompasses the Bosques de Lindora, Honduras, Lagos, Montana, Valle del Sol, Villa Real, Villas del Sol and Vista Azul villages.

Demographics 

For the 2011 census, Pozos had a population of  inhabitants.

Transportation

Road transportation 
The district is covered by the following road routes:
 National Route 27
 National Route 147
 National Route 310

References 

Districts of San José Province
Populated places in San José Province